Oxley is an electoral district of the Legislative Assembly in the Australian state of New South Wales.

History
Oxley was created in 1920, with the introduction of proportional representation, replacing Gloucester and Raleigh, and elected three members.  It was named after John Oxley.  In 1927 it was divided into the single-member electorates of Oxley, Gloucester and Raleigh.  In 1988 it was abolished and replaced by Port Macquarie. It was recreated in 1991.

Oxley is one of three original (post 1927 redistribution) electorates to have never been held by the Labor Party, the other districts being Tamworth and Upper Hunter.  The National Party has held the seat since its current incarnation was created in 1991.

At the 2007 election it included most of Bellingen Shire (including Bellingen and Dorrigo), Nambucca Shire (including Nambucca Heads, Macksville and Bowraville), Kempsey Shire, some of inland Port Macquarie-Hastings Council, including Wauchope, the lightly inhabited northwest of the Mid-Coast Council, and the lightly inhabited eastern fringe of Walcha Shire and Armidale Regional Council.

The next redistribution taking effect at the 2015 state election redrew Oxley to contain the entirety of Bellingen Shire, Nambucca Shire, Kempsey Shire and a large inland component of Port Macquarie-Hastings Council. Its significant population centres include Bellingen, Nambucca Heads, Macksville, Kempsey and Wauchope.

Members for Oxley

First incarnation 1920-1988

Election results

References

Oxley
1920 establishments in Australia
Oxley
1988 disestablishments in Australia
Oxley
1991 establishments in Australia
Oxley